The Fillmore is a historic music venue in San Francisco, California.

Built in 1912 and originally named the Majestic Hall, it became the Fillmore Auditorium in 1954. It is in Western Addition, on the edge of the Fillmore District and Upper Fillmore neighborhood.

History
The building which became The Fillmore was built in 1912 and initially housed the Majestic Hall and Academy of Dancing. Its name was changed from the Majestic Hall in 1936 to the Ambassador Dance Hall. From 1939 to 1952, it operated as the Ambassador Roller Skating Rink. In 1954, Charles Sullivan, one of the most successful African-American businessmen in San Francisco at the time, started booking bands and renamed the venue The Fillmore Auditorium. In December 1965, Sullivan let Bill Graham use his dance hall permit to book a benefit for the San Francisco Mime Troupe, and after that Graham continued to book shows there. Sullivan was murdered in August 1966 at the age of 57.

On May 27, 28, and 29, 1966, The Velvet Underground and Nico played the Fillmore Auditorium as part of Andy Warhol's Exploding Plastic Inevitable avant-garde multimedia show. Their light show engineer Danny Williams, who pioneered many of today's standard practices in rock music light shows, built a light system at the Fillmore that included stroboscopes, slides and film projections onstage. The system was partially inspired by Jonas Mekas' earlier film projections at concerts held at The Cinematheque in New York. As conceived by Warhol and Williams, the show also included wild, free dancing both in the crowd and onstage. Although The Velvet Underground's proto-punk aesthetics failed to resonate with the incipient San Francisco counterculture, Graham retained Williams to build additional light systems. These innovations were to become part of the Fillmore Auditorium's prestige and image and served as the basis for the systems subsequently used at the Fillmore East and Fillmore West venues.

In the mid-1960s, the Fillmore Auditorium became the focal point for psychedelic music and the counterculture in general, with such acts as the Grateful Dead, The Steve Miller Band, Jefferson Airplane, Quicksilver Messenger Service, Moby Grape, The Doors, Jimi Hendrix Experience, The Byrds, Big Brother and the Holding Company, Santana, Frank Zappa's The Mothers of Invention, and British acts The Who, Cream, and Pink Floyd  all performing at the venue. Besides rock, Graham also featured non-rock acts such as Lenny Bruce, Miles Davis, Rahsaan Roland Kirk, Charles Lloyd, Aretha Franklin, and Otis Redding as well as poetry readings. The Grateful Dead played a total of 51 concerts at the venue from 1965 through 1969.

B.B. King's well-received performances at the venue served to introduce many fans to the authentic sounds that inspired the blues rock subgenre. He subsequently became a countercultural icon, appearing at many rock festivals. Albert King also played a series of well-received shows here in 1968, with one of them being released as his first live album "Live/Wire Blues." Eventually, two additional shows would be released as "Wednesday Night in San Francisco" and "Thursday Night in San Francisco."

The venue was known for its ambience as well as for the musical performances, often with swirling light-show projections, strobe lights and uninhibited dancing. The cultural impact of the Fillmore was very large. It is referenced by Hunter S. Thompson in his 1971 novel Fear and Loathing in Las Vegas in a description of the counterculture of the 1960s in the San Francisco Bay Area.

Fillmore West, Fillmore East and the New Old Fillmore

In the summer of 1968, the continuing socioeconomic deterioration of the surrounding neighborhood and the modest capacity of the venue compelled Graham to abandon the Fillmore Auditorium only two years after his famous association with the venue commenced. That July, he assumed ownership of the Carousel Ballroom at nearby 10 South Van Ness Avenue. The venue had been previously managed as a cooperative venture for several months by the Grateful Dead, Jefferson Airplane and other Bay Area groups. The Carousel subsequently operated as the Fillmore West, paralleling Graham's Fillmore East in New York City's East Village. However, both venues were shuttered by Graham in July 1971 as arena bookings on popular music tours became increasingly prevalent.

For an indeterminate period from 1969 to 1970, the Fillmore Auditorium was operated by new management as the New Old Fillmore; during this period, the Grateful Dead and The Stooges performed notable engagements at the venue.

The Elite Club
The original Fillmore location became a venue called The Elite Club. For several years in the early 1980s, punk promoters Paul Rat and Wes Robinson booked punk rock shows at this venue. Punk bands that performed at The Elite Club include Crucifix, Discharge, 45 Grave, FEAR, D.O.A, Verbal Abuse, Social Distortion, Bad Religion, Black Flag, Bad Brains, Dead Kennedys, Red Rockers, T.S.O.L., Flipper, Gang of Four, and Public Image Ltd.

Reopening and national franchise
The Fillmore reopened under Graham's management in the mid-1980s, but it was damaged and closed by the Loma Prieta earthquake of October 1989. After Graham died in a helicopter crash in 1991, those close to him decided to carry out his final wish to retrofit and reopen the original Fillmore, which required much structural work. The Fillmore reopened on April 27, 1994, with the band The Smashing Pumpkins playing an unannounced surprise show, and Primus playing the first official reopening show the following night. The Fillmore has once again become a San Francisco hot spot with frequent shows. For a standard show, the capacity of the Fillmore is 1,315 guests.

Since 2007, the Fillmore is leased and operated by Live Nation.

Live Nation has recently begun a campaign to expand the Fillmore "brand" by changing the names of a number of established clubs it owns around the U.S., as well as opening new clubs. This includes clubs in Denver, Detroit, Philadelphia, and the Fillmore at the Jackie Gleason Theater in Miami Beach, Florida. The Fillmore Charlotte opened in June 2009. A Fillmore in the Washington, D.C., suburb of Silver Spring, Maryland, broke ground in 2010 and opened in late 2011. The 2,000-seat Fillmore New Orleans opened in 2019 on the second floor of Harrah's New Orleans casino. The Central, Minneapolis Fillmore venue opened in February 2020.

The Fillmore brand was also attached to Irving Plaza in New York City from 2007 to 2010.

Locations

Current

Former

Traditions
The Fillmore is also well known for its psychedelic concert posters by artists who in the 1960s included Wes Wilson and Rick Griffin. Copies of the night's poster are given to fans free of charge as they exit selected, sold-out shows. A curated  collection of these posters is on display in the mezzanine level of the auditorium today.

Other traditions are carried on to this day at the Fillmore in San Francisco. One is a large tub of free apples for concert goers positioned near the entrance. Another is a "greeter" who welcomes each guest as they enter with: "Welcome to the Fillmore!"

See also
House of Blues

References

External links

 "Fillmore San Francisco" official website
 Chronology of San Francisco Rock 1965–1969

Music venues in San Francisco
Theatres in San Francisco
Western Addition, San Francisco
Hippie movement
Landmarks in San Francisco